The Dark River is a DNR-designated trout stream located approximately 10 miles north of Chisholm, Minnesota. Anglers can expect to catch Brook Trout and the occasional Northern Pike.

See also
List of rivers of Minnesota

References

External links
Minnesota Watersheds
USGS Hydrologic Unit Map - State of Minnesota (1974)

Rivers of Minnesota
Rivers of St. Louis County, Minnesota